André Luiz Pfaltzgraff Frambach (born February 15, 1997) is a Brazilian actor, he is the current boyfriend of actress Larissa Manoela since 2022.

Career 
He began his career at age nine, as Leandro in "Por Toda Minha Vida." He later acted a role of Dalton Vigh as a child, Juvenaldo Ferreira in " Duas Caras", Davi in the miniseries " Queridos Amigos", and Franzé in "Ciranda de Pedra". In 2008, he also made a special appearance in A Favorita as Huey, and in 2009, as a boy in Paraíso. In 2016 returned to telenovela like Juninho, A Lei do Amor.

In 2017, he also played a lead role in the 26th season Malhação: Vidas Brasileiras. In 2019, he lived Julinho, one of the protagonists of the soap opera Éramos Seis. In 2020, Frambach played the lead role of João in the comedy film Airplane Mode with Larissa Manoela.

In 2022, he played the lead role of Miguel in the Netflix series Temporada de Verão and also played the role of Heitor Gabriel Bastos "Rico" in the telenovela Cara e Coragem.

Personal life 
In January 2019, he started dating actress Rayssa Bratillieri, with whom he made a romantic couple in Malhação: Vidas Brasileiras and Éramos Seis. The couple ended their relationship in June 2021 after more than 2 years together.

In July 2022, he started dating actress Larissa Manoela, with whom he had already had a relationship between July and October 2021. In December 2022, André proposed to Larissa.

Filmography

Television

Film

Theater

Awards and nominations

References

External links 
 

1997 births
Living people
People from Niterói
Brazilian male television actors
Brazilian male film actors
21st-century Brazilian male actors